Sabah Football Club Sdn Bhd.  (Sabah FC Sdn Bhd) is a Sabahan limited liability sports and club holding company based in Sabah, Malaysia. (Sdn Bhd stands for Sendirian Berhad or Private company in English) Formerly known as the North Borneo Football Association and then the Sabah Football Association (SAFA) by the Sabah government, it became a private independent company in 2021 by the Sabah sports organization holder to become an individual company that holds Sabah youth and sports clubs. Today, the company has control over a football club that has two teams namely Sabah FC and Sabah Youth FC (U18/U23), a stadium and also websites.

References

Entertainment companies established in 2021